Nortonville is an unincorporated ghost town in Contra Costa County, California.

Location
Nortonville is located on Nortonville Road just outside the city of Pittsburg in Contra Costa County.  The town site is now part of the Black Diamond Mines Regional Preserve.

History

Nortonville was founded by Noah Norton in 1855. He, along with three partners named Cutler, Matheson and Sturgis, started the Black Diamond coal mine at Nortonville in 1860.  The mine was incorporated as the Black Diamond Coal Mining Company in June 1861.

Nortonville was also the southern terminus of the six mile long Black Diamond Coal Mining Railroad (also known as the "Black Diamond Railroad"), built in 1868.  The railroad connected Nortonville with the San Joaquin River, at Black Diamond Landing, California, with a stop at Cornwall, California (the latter two towns are now a part of the city of Pittsburg, California).

The town was home to many Welsh miners. In 1885 the Black Diamond Coal Mining Company moved all the coal miners from Nortonville to another of the Company's mines at Black Diamond, Washington Territory. The Nortonville mine was so deep that it acted as a drain for the surrounding mines, and when the owners of the other mines refused to contribute to the cost of pumping out the water, the company simply shut down and moved its operations. Currently what is left behind at Nortonville is a deserted area.  The brick foundation of the mine's hoisting works, remnants of the railroad bed, and an old cemetery are all that remain. The cemetery is known as the "Rose Hill Cemetery," which was named for Emma Rose, daughter of Alvinza Hayward, who was president and chief stockholder of the Black Diamond Coal Mining Company. In the 1940s Mrs. Rose donated the cemetery to the county.

Four other coal mining towns were established in the same mining district: Somersville, Stewartsville, West Hartley and Judsonville.

A post office operated at Nortonville from 1874 to 1910, with closures in 1887 and from 1890 to 1891.

References

External links
 "Nortonville" Nortonville on ghosttowns.com.
  Life Sketch of Pierre Barlow Cornwall, written by his son Bruce Cornwall, 1906.
 "History; The Company" (history of the Black Diamond Coal Mining Company). Retrieved 2011-02-02.

Former settlements in Contra Costa County, California
Ghost towns in California
Ghost towns in the San Francisco Bay Area
Populated places established in 1855
1855 establishments in California
1910 disestablishments in California
Company towns in California
Here is Rose Hill Cemetery I shot with my drone in the summer of 2015 https://www.flickr.com/photos/147287664@N02/30358971202/in/album-72157675514398815/